Dieter Bogatzki (25 January 1942 – 5 December 2000) was a German middle-distance runner. He competed in the men's 800 metres at the 1964 Summer Olympics.

Bogatzki was born in Chojnice in 1942, while the Polish town was under Nazi Germany occupation in World War II.

References

1942 births
2000 deaths
Athletes (track and field) at the 1964 Summer Olympics
German male middle-distance runners
Olympic athletes of the United Team of Germany
Sportspeople from Pomeranian Voivodeship
People from Chojnice